Hans Lang (5 July 1908, in Vienna – 28 January 1992, in Vienna) was an Austrian composer of light music, film music and Viennese songs.

He wrote one operetta, the musikalisches Lustspiel, Lisa, benimm dich!, which premiered in Vienna on 21 March 1939.

Selected songs 

 It's Oh So Quiet
 Wozu ist die Straße da
 Lach ein bissel, wein ein bissel
 Liebe kleine Schaffnerin
 Der alte Herr Kanzleirat
 Wenn der Steffel wieder wird, so wie er war
 Mariandl

 Du bist die Rose vom Wörthersee
 Stell dir vor, es geht das Licht aus
 Wenn ich mit meinem Dackel
 Wann i blau bin-siecht mei Alte "Rot"
 Das Wiener Wetter
 Der alte Sünder

Film music

References 

 Much of the information in this article is taken from the German Wikipedia article.

Austrian classical composers
Austrian opera composers
Male opera composers
Wienerlied
Composers from Vienna
1908 births
1992 deaths
20th-century classical composers
Austrian male classical composers
20th-century male musicians